Herman Davis "Dave" Burrell (born September 10, 1940) is an American jazz pianist. He has played with many jazz musicians including Archie Shepp, Pharoah Sanders, Marion Brown and David Murray.

Biography 
Born in Middletown, Ohio, United States, Burrell grew fond of jazz at a young age after meeting Herb Jeffries. Burrell studied music at the University of Hawaii  from 1958 to 1960, then, beginning in 1961, attended the Berklee College of Music in Boston, graduating with degrees in composition/arranging and performance in 1965. While in Boston, he played with Tony Williams and Sam Rivers.

In 1965, Burrell moved to New York City, where he worked and recorded with Grachan Moncur III, Marion Brown, and Pharoah Sanders. He also started the Untraditional Jazz Improvisational Team with saxophonist Byard Lancaster, bassist Sirone, and drummer Bobby Kapp. In 1968, Burrell co-founded The 360 Degree Music Experience with Grachan Moncur III and Beaver Harris and recorded two albums with the group. The following year, Burrell began an association with Archie Shepp, with whom he would play the 1969 Pan-African Festival in Algiers, and with whom he would go on to record nearly twenty albums.

Burrell's first album as a leader was High Won-High Two (1968), produced by Alan Douglas. Echo and La Vie de Bohème were recorded for BYG Actuel in Paris in 1969. He recorded Round Midnight for  Nippon Columbia.

In 1978 he composed a jazz opera entitled Windward Passages, in collaboration with Swedish poet and lyricist Monika Larsson, with an album of the same name, based on the opera, released in 1979 on Hathut in Switzerland. Their touring and recording collaborations resulted in Daybreak (1989), Brother to Brother (Gazell, 1992), In Concert (Victo, 1992), and Windward Passages (Black Saint, 1993). Burrell appears on Murray's DIW albums Lovers, Deep River, Ballads, Spirituals, Tenors, Remembrances, and Picasso, recorded between 1988 and 1993.

Burrell tours and performs as a soloist and as a leader of a duo, trio, and larger ensembles. He recorded for the High Two label from Philadelphia. His 2004 album Expansion (with bassist William Parker and drummer Andrew Cyrille) was acclaimed by NPR, Down Beat, Village Voice, JazzTimes, The Wire, and others. Splasc Records in Italy released a studio solo piano recording, Margy Pargy in 2005. In 2006, Burrell released Consequences (Amulet), a live duet set with drummer Billy Martin, and Momentum (High Two), featuring bassist Michael Formanek and drummer Guillermo E. Brown. RAI Trade, Italy, did a live recording of Burrell's and Larsson's collaborations, Dave Burrell Plays His Songs, featuring singer Leena Conquest, that was released in 2010.

In 2022, it was announced that Burrell had donated his archive to the Center for American Music in the University of Pittsburgh Library System.

Discography

As leader

As sideman or co-leader
With Albert Ayler
 Holy Ghost: Rare & Unissued Recordings (1962–70) (Revenant, 2004): one track

With Marion Brown
 Three for Shepp (Impulse!, 1966)
 Juba-Lee (Fontana, 1967)
 79118 Live (DIW, 1979)
 Live at the Black Musicians' Conference, 1981 (NoBusiness Records, 2018)
 Capricorn Moon to Juba Lee Revisited (ezz-thetics, 2019)

With Stanley Cowell
 Questions / Answers (Trio Records, 1974)

With Henry Grimes, Roberto Pettinato, and Tyshawn Sorey
 Purity (Sony, 2012)
 Same Egg (Sony, 2013)

With Duo Baars-Henneman
 Trandans (Wig, 2017)

With Noah Howard
 At Judson Hall (ESP-Disk, 1968)

With Khan Jamal
 Speak Easy (Gazell, 1989)

With Stafford James
 Jazz a Confronto 26 (Horo Records, 1976)

With Giuseppi Logan
 The Giuseppi Logan Quintet (Tompkins Square, 2010)

With Grachan Moncur III
 New Africa (BYG Actuel, 1969)
 Shadows (Denon, 1977)

With David Murray
 Hope Scope (Black Saint, 1987)
 Ballads (DIW, 1988)
 Deep River (DIW, 1988)
 Spirituals (DIW, 1988)
 Lovers (DIW, 1988)
 Tenors (DIW, 1988)
 Lucky Four (Tutu, 1989)
 Last of the Hipmen (Jazzline, 1989)
 Remembrances (DIW, 1990)
 Death of a Sideman (DIW, 1991)
 In Concert (Victo, 1991)
 Picasso (DIW, 1992)

With Sunny Murray
 Homage to Africa (BYG Actuel, 1969)
 Sunshine (BYG Actuel, 1969)
 Charred Earth (Kharma, 1977) 
 Perles noires Vol. I (Eremite Records, 2005)

With Alessandro Nobile and Antonio Moncada
 Reaction And Reflection (Rudi Records, 2018)

With William Parker
 The Inside Songs of Curtis Mayfield (Rai Trade, 2007) 
 I Plan to Stay a Believer (AUM Fidelity, 2010)
 Essence of Ellington (Centering, 2012)

With Odeon Pope
 Epitome (Soul Note, 1993)
 Changes & Changes (CIMP, 1999)

With Roswell Rudd
 Inside Job (Arista/Freedom, 1976)

With Pharoah Sanders
 Tauhid (Impulse!, 1967)

With Archie Shepp
 The Way Ahead (Impulse!, 1968)
 Blasé (BYG Actuel, 1969)
 Black Gipsy (America, 1969)
 Pitchin Can (America, 1969)
 Live at the Pan-African Festival (BYG Actuel, 1969)
 Yasmina, a Black Woman (BYG Actuel, 1969)
 For Losers (Impulse!, 1971)
 Things Have Got to Change (Impulse!, 1971)
 The Cry of My People (Impulse!, 1972)
 Attica Blues (Impulse!, 1972)
 Kwanza (Impulse!, 1974)
 There's a Trumpet in My Soul (Arista Freedom 1975)
 Montreux One (Arista Freedom, 1975)
 Montreux Two (Arista Freedom, 1975)
 A Sea of Faces (Black Saint, 1975)
 Body and Soul (Horo, 1975)
 U-Jaama (Unite) (Unitelidis, 1975)
 Jazz a Confronto 27 (Horo, 1976)
 Lover Man (Timeless, 1989)

With Sonny Sharrock
 Black Woman (Vortex, 1969)

With Alan Silva
 Luna Surface (BYG Actuel, 1969)
 Skillfullness (ESP-Disk, 1969)
 Seasons (BYG Actuel, 1971)

With Bob Stewart
 Then & Now (Postcards, 1996)
 The Crave (NoBusiness Records, 2016)

With Steve Swell
 Soul Travelers (RogueArt, 2016)

With Clifford Thornton
 Ketchaoua (BYG Actuel, 1967)

With Le Tigre des platanes
 Disappearing (Mr Morezon, 2013)

With Patty Waters
 College Tour (ESP-Disk, 1966)
 The Complete ESP-Disk Recordings (ESP-Disk, 2006)

With Bobby Zankel
 Celebrating William Parker @ 65 (Not Two, 2017)

With The 360 Degree Music Experience
 From Ragtime to No Time (360 Records, 1975)
 In: Sanity (Black Saint, 1976)

References

External links 
Official site
 
Consequences with Billy Martin

1940 births
Living people
American jazz pianists
American male pianists
Musicians from Ohio
Columbia Records artists
BYG Actuel artists
Pew Fellows in the Arts
20th-century American pianists
American male jazz musicians
The 360 Degree Music Experience members
20th-century American male musicians
RogueArt artists
NoBusiness Records artists